In Our Own Sweet Time is the third studio album by Australian singer-songwriter Vance Joy. The album was released on 10 June 2022 through Liberation Music. The album was announced on 7 April 2022 and written during the COVID-19 pandemic. It was preceded by the singles "Missing Piece", "Don't Fade", "Clarity" and "Every Side of You".

The album will be supported by the Long Way Home Tour, to commence in Darwin on 17 September 2022.

Background
Joy said that the album is about the idea of creating a life – and a world – with someone special, stating: "I'm always drawn to the idea of timelessness or that shared moment that takes you out of the chaos outside. If the world is crazy, you can retreat somewhere. It's always hard to think of the right title but I think that sums up the album perfectly."

Singles
"Missing Piece" was released as the lead single from the album on 21 May 2021. The song peaked at number 14 on the Australian Singles Chart and has been certified double platinum. The Annelise Hickey-directed video won the ARIA Award for Best Video at the 2021 ARIA Music Awards.

"Don't Fade" premiered on Triple J 10 February 2022 was officially released the following day as the album's second single. 

"Clarity" premiered on 7 April 2022, alongside the album's announcement. The song was released on 8 April 2022. "Clarity" was nominated for Best Pop Release and Song of the Year at the 2022 ARIA Music Awards.

The fourth single "Every Side of You" was released on 3 June 2022, a week before the album's release date.

"Catalonia" was released on 10 June 2022, alongside the album's release.

Track listing

Notes
  indicates an additional producer
  indicates a co-producer

Personnel
Musicians
 Vance Joy – vocals (all tracks), guitar (2, 3, 5, 7, 9), ukulele (4), banjo (11)
 Dave Bassett – acoustic guitar (1, 2, 4, 6, 9, 12), bass (1, 2, 4–6, 9, 12), piano (1, 2, 5, 6, 11, 12); electric guitar, synthesizer (1, 2, 5, 6, 9); backing vocals (2); electric piano, Hammond B3 organ, Wurlitzer (9); baritone guitar, harmonium, whistle (12)
 Edwin White – drums (2–7, 9–12), percussion (2, 4–6, 8–11), keyboards (4, 6, 10, 11); background vocals, electric guitar (11)
 Kieran Conran – euphonium (2), trombone (2, 9), bass trombone (9)
 Mark Fitzpatrick – flugelhorn (2, 9), trumpet (4, 7, 9)
 Nicolas Fleury – French horn (2)
 Joel Little – bass, programming (3, 7); drums, guitar, keyboards (3); backing vocals (7)
 Will Morrissey – saxophone (4)
 David Biral – bass, drums, keyboards, percussion, programming (8)
 Denzel Baptiste – bass, drums, keyboards, percussion, programming (8)
 David Longstreth – guitar (8, 11)
 James Earp – bass, guitar (10)
 Gethin Williams – guitar (10)
 Dan Wilson – guitar, pump organ, upright piano (11)

Technical
 Dale Becker – mastering (1, 2, 4–12)
 Ted Jensen – mastering (3)
 Jeff Ellis – mixing (1, 2, 5, 6, 8–12)
 Spike Stent – mixing (3, 4, 7)
 Kayla Reagan – mix engineering (1, 2, 5, 6, 8–12)
 Dave Bassett – engineering (1, 2, 4–6, 9, 11, 12)
 Guus Hoevenaars – engineering (2–7, 9, 11, 12)
 Joel Little – engineering (3, 7)
 David Longstreth – engineering (8)
 James Earp – engineering (10)
 John Mark Nelson – engineering (11)
 Sara Mulford – engineering (11)
 Trevor Taylor – mixing assistance (1, 2, 5, 6, 8–12)

Charts

References

2022 albums
Vance Joy albums
Liberation Records albums